Jill Ann Mikucki is an American microbiologist, educator and Antarctic researcher, best known for her work at Blood Falls demonstrating that microbes can grow below ice in the absence of sunlight. She is a leader of international teams studying study ecosystems under the ice.

Early life and education
Mikucki earned her B.A. in 1996 at the University of North Carolina, Wilmington, her M.S. in 2001 from Portland State University, and her Ph.D. in 2005 at Montana State University. A life-long love of cold and snow helped lead her to a career in Antarctic research. Mikucki conducted her Ph.D. research on Blood Falls, a plume of iron-oxide rich water that flows from beneath the Taylor Glacier in the McMurdo Dry Valleys of Antarctica. Mikucki's work on Blood Falls was the first to describe the microbiology and geochemistry of the feature.

Career and impact

As a postdoctoral fellow at Harvard University (2006–07) and Dartmouth College (2008), and a professor  at the University  of Tennessee, Mikucki continued her work at Blood Falls. Mikucki's work demonstrated that microbes can grow below ice in the absence of sunlight by using sulfate and iron  to help them metabolize organic matter.

Her continuing work at Blood Falls led to the discovery of a network of salty groundwater beneath Antarctica's McMurdo Dry Valleys, which is likely the source of the Blood Falls outflow, and a habitat for subsurface microorganisms. The work was also the first ever use of airborne resistivity in Antarctica.

Mikucki was part of the first team to drill into and sample an Antarctic subglacial lake, which demonstrated the existence of life deep beneath Antarctic ice for the first time.

Selected works

References

External links

 Jill Mikucki's webpage at the University of Tennessee

See also
 Blood Falls
 John Charles Priscu

Living people
American microbiologists
American women biologists
University of North Carolina at Wilmington alumni
Portland State University alumni
Montana State University alumni
University of Tennessee faculty
American Antarctic scientists
Women Antarctic scientists
Year of birth missing (living people)
Women microbiologists
American women academics
21st-century American women scientists
21st-century American biologists
21st-century American academics